Snežana Mišković (born December 19, 1958), better known by her stage name Viktorija, is a Serbian female rock singer known for her raspy voice.

Career

Early career and Aska
Snežana Mišković was born in Vučitrn, SAP Kosovo, SFR Yugoslavia. She came to Belgrade as a student in 1976, where she started performing with Society of Culture and Arts Branko Krsmanović and the band Pop Polifonija.

In 1981, Mišković formed the girl group Aska with Snežana Stamenković and Izolda Barudžija. Aska represented Yugoslavia at the 1982 Eurovision Song Contest with the song "Halo, halo". The three recorded their debut album Disco Rock in 1982. Stamenković and Barudžija soon left the group and were replaced by Suzana Perović and Nera. The three recorded the second Aska album titled Katastrofa ("Catastrophe") in 1984.

As Viktorija
In 1986, Mišković disbanded Aska and recorded the song "Šarene ulice" ("Colorful Streets") and formed the band Viktorija, the name which she would adopt as her own stage name after it became associated with her personally rather than the band.

In 1988, Viktorija released the debut album Spavaćeš sam (You'll Be Sleeping Alone). The album's main hits were the songs "Barakuda" ("Barracuda", written by Piloti frontman Kiki Lesendrić), "Spavaćeš sam" (written by Osmi Putnik frontman Zlatan Stipišić), "Sami" ("Alone" cover of Ohio Express' song "Yummy Yummy Yummy" with lyrics written by Riblja Čorba frontman Bora Đorđević) and the ballad "Daj, ne pitaj" ("Please, Don't Ask", written by Stipišić and Đorđević). The album featured numerous guest musicians: Bora Đorđević (on vocals), Izolda Barudžija (on backing vocals), Ekatarina Velika members Milan Mladenović (on backing vocals) and Bojan Pečar (on bass guitar), Rex Ilusivii (emulator programming), and others. In 1989, Viktorija was voted the Best Female Singer by the readers of Pop Rock magazine. At the beginning of 1990, Viktorija, alongside Riblja Čorba, Valentino, Galija and Bajaga i Instruktori, performed in Timișoara, Romania, at the three-day concerts organized two months after the Romanian Revolution. All five acts performed on three concerts in Timișoara Olympia Hall in front of some 20,000 people each night. During the same year, she won Female Singer of the Year Award at the MESAM music festival.

In 1991, she released her second studio album, Ja verujem (I Believe). The album featured Kiki Lesendrić, Bora Đorđević, Zlatan Stipišić, poet Radoman Kanjevac, lyricist Marina Tucaković, Bajaga i Instruktori members Saša Lokner and Žika Milenković, and others as authors. Ja verujem became diamond record due to popularity of the songs "Rat i mir (Ljubav je)..." ("War and Peace (Love Is...)", a duet with Kiki Lesendrić (competed for Yugoslav representative to Eurovision Song Contest in Zagreb in 1990), which revolved around a musical theme from Marty Friedman's "Thunder March"), "Arija" ("Aria"), "Od Splita do Beograda" ("From Split to Belgrade", a duet with Dino Dvornik), "Samo teraj ti po svome" ("Just Carry On"), "Kanada" ("Canada"), "Ni nebo mi nije visoko" ("Even Sky Doesn't Seem that High") and "Isus" ("Jesus"). During the same year she recorded a cover of Zdravko Čolić's hit "Ljubav je samo reč" ("Love Is only a Word") for the Evergereen Evening of Belgrade Spring Festival. The song was released on the 1991 compilation album Viktorija. In 1992, she held her first solo concert in Belgrade, in Sava Centar. In 1994, the songs "Rat i mir", "Od Splita do Beograda" and "Arija" were released on Komuna compilation albums Da li znaš da te volim: Balade (Did You Know that I Love You: Ballads), Pakleni vozači: Jugoslovenski hard rock (Hell Riders: Yugoslav Hard Rock) and Volim, volim, volim žene: Pevačice i ženske grupe (I Love, I Love, I Love, I Love Women: Female Singers and Girl Bands), respectively.

In 1995, she released her third album Ja znam da je tebi krivo (I Know You're Jealous). Part of the lyrics on the album were written by Rambo Amadeus. Album featured a cover of Bijelo Dugme's song "A koliko si ih imala do sad" ("How Much of Them Did You Have 'till Now", Viktorija's version entitled "Avantura – ljubomora" ("Adventure – Jealousy"), a cover of Zdravko Čolić's "Zagrli me" ("Hug Me", Viktorija's version entitled "Ako priđeš bliže" ("If You Come Closer")) and a cover of Jovanotti's song "Io penso positivo" (Viktorija's version featuring Serbian language lyrics and entitled "Ja znam da je tebi krivo"). During 1996, she promoted the album with a large number of concerts, on which she performed with a band of young musicians from Kosovska Mitrovica.

In 1997, she announced her retirement. The compilation album Kada gužva prođe (When the Rush Is Over) was released in 1998. In 2000, she made a brief comeback only to record the live album Nostalgija (Nostalgia), which featured covers of songs by Parni Valjak, Xenia, Indexi, Kerber, Smak, Atomsko Sklonište, Oliver Mandić, Bijelo Dugme, D' Boys, Toni Montano, and others. The song "Senke uspomena" ("Shadow of Memories"), written by Kiki Lesendrić and recorded by Viktorija for the movie Shadows of Memories, was also released on the album.

In 2005, after many years she spent away from the public, Viktorija appeared at Beovizija music festival performing the song "Kaži, sestro" ("Say, Sister") and won sixth place. In 2011, she released the single "Spas" ("Salvation").

Reality TV
Mišković was contestant of the following reality TV shows:

 Farma, Season #1
 Zadruga, Season #1

Legacy
The song "Barakuda" was covered by Serbian rock band Negative on their 1999 album Negative.

The album Spavaćeš sam was polled in 1998 as 49th on the list of 100 greatest Yugoslav popular music albums in the book YU 100: najbolji albumi jugoslovenske rok i pop muzike (YU 100: The Best albums of Yugoslav pop and rock music).

In 2011, the song "Barakuda" was polled, by the listeners of Radio 202, one of 60 greatest songs released by PGP-RTB/PGP-RTS during the sixty years of the label's existence.

Discography

Studio albums
Spavaćeš sam (1988)
Ja verujem (1991)
Ja znam da je tebi krivo (1995)

Compilations
Viktorija (1991)
Kada gužva prođe (1998)

Live albums
Nostalgija (live/cover album; 2000)

Singles
"Kaži, sestro" (2005)
"Spas" (2011)

References 

EX YU ROCK enciklopedija 1960–2006, Janjatović Petar;

Further reading 
EX YU ROCK enciklopedija 1960–2006, Janjatović Petar;

External links 
Viktorija at Discogs

1958 births
Living people
People from Vushtrri
Kosovo Serbs
Serbian rock singers
Yugoslav rock singers
20th-century Serbian women singers
Yugoslav women singers
Kosovan singers
Women rock singers
Glam metal musicians
Women heavy metal singers
Beovizija contestants